Kofi Jantuah (born 16 June 1974) is a Ghanaian professional boxer that fights at middleweight. He was born in Kumasi, Ghana and now lives in Las Vegas.

IBF light middleweight title fight
Kofi fought Kassim Ouma for the IBF light middleweight world title, where he lost by unanimous decision.

IBF middleweight title fight
Kofi fought Arthur Abraham for the IBF middleweight world title, where he lost by unanimous decision.

Other notable opponents
Kofi has fought Dmitry Pirog, Daniel Santos, Donny McCrary, Jaime Manuel Gomez, and Marco Antonio Rubio with wins against Santos, McCrary, and Rubio.

Professional boxing record

Accomplishments
Kofi is the former holder of the Ghanaian light welterweight title, Commonwealth (British Empire) welterweight title, and the WBC International light middleweight title.

Dmitry Pirog upon his retirement, when asked about his toughest opponent, recalled Jantuah fight as the most difficult:

References

External links

1974 births
Living people
Light-middleweight boxers
Middleweight boxers
Sportspeople from Las Vegas
Ghanaian male boxers
Sportspeople from Kumasi